Baba Zeyd or Baba Zaid or Baba Zayed may refer to:
 Baba Zeyd, Kermanshah
 Baba Zeyd, Khuzestan
 Baba Zeyd, Lorestan